Judith Hall is an American poet.

Biography

Judith Hall is the author of five poetry collections, including  To Put The Mouth To  (William Morrow), selected for the National Poetry Series by Richard Howard;  Three Trios , her translations of the imaginary poet JII (Northwestern); and, most recently, Prospects (LSU Press). She also collaborated with David Lehman on Poetry Forum  (Bayeaux Arts) which she illustrated.

She directed the PEN Syndicated Fiction Project and was senior program specialist for literary publishing at the National Endowment for the Arts. Since 1995, she has served as poetry editor of  Antioch Review , and her poems have appeared in  The Atlantic , American Poetry Review , The New Republic , The Paris Review , Poetry, The Progressive , and other journals, and in the Pushcart Prize and Best American Poetry  anthology series.

She taught at UCLA and the Art Center College of Design and, for many years, at the California Institute of Technology, after moving to New York, she taught at the Columbia University Graduate School of the Arts. Hall received awards from the  National Endowment for the Arts and the Guggenheim and Ingram Merrill Foundations.

Awards
 2006 Guggenheim Fellowship
 NEA Fellowship
 Pushcart Prize
 Ingram Merrill Fellowship
 1991 National Poetry Series

Works

Poetry

Poem-eo (Poem Video)

“Natural / Work Hard / Ability”, LSU Press on Vimeo

List of Poems

"The God that Took the Place of Pleasure", Boston Review, DECEMBER 2004/JANUARY 2005 
"SO"; "GARMENTS OF GLADNESS IN A MIME OF TERROR"; "LAMENT", Inertia Magazine
"The Morning After the Afternoon of a Faun", Ploughshares, Spring 2007    
"The Girl's Will; or Optimism", Poesy Galore
"Worship of Mars"; "Worship of Venus", Jacket 19, October 2002

Prose

Anthologies

Reviews
“Judith Hall’s translations of the ancient poet known as J II read as richly researched and imaginatively restored for a contemporary audience.  The only catch is that J II never existed . . . For her latest book, Three Trios, Hall concocted the alter ego of J II, a Jewish female poet who lived in the sixth century B.C.E. who wrote the Apocryphal book of Judith as well as a mysterious, coded set of pagan poems associated with the cult of Dionysius.  These ‘translations’ emit the same earthiness and sensuality of the best ancient erotic poetry but are framed in Hall's contemporary language – not stale, but sexy. . . . The book is such a complete forgery that it includes a scholarly introduction to J II and footnotes throughout.  All of Hall's efforts add up to a powerful, imaginative experiment in poetry.” American Poet, The Journal of the Academy of American Poets 

"In the presence of one's own verbal facility, a poet may discover various methods of making things more difficult for herself.  Judith Hall's method is twofold:  She works with extremely difficult ‘material’, such as cancer and the development of mother-daughter relationships, and she calls upon the verse tradition for ways of handling it. . . . Miss Hall makes genuine poems of considerable power." Henry Taylor on Anatomy, Errata, The Washington Times

"Hall's feminist poetry challenges through psychological authenticity and linguistic struggle -- the assumptions that bind us . . . Insistently clear-eyed and unsentimental, Hall achieves both fluency and linguistic pressures through form. . . . but these forms are never ornamental or derivative.  Hall sculpts them to her voice with the precision of Louise Bogan, and with greater inventiveness.  She renovates the tradition of love poetry from within; her sonnet sequences, aubades, and epithalamiums are not just anti-Petrarchen, they reevaluate the terms of discourse between men and women beyond anything heard of in the philosophy of George Meredith or Edna St. Vincent Millay."  Bonnie Costello on To Put The Mouth To, The Gettysburg Review

See also

 Feminist poets
 Wikipedia's feminism portal

References

Year of birth missing (living people)
Living people
American women poets
Feminist writers
Literary editors
Education writers
Antioch Review
American women academics
20th-century American women writers
21st-century American women writers
University of California, Los Angeles faculty
California Institute of Technology faculty
Columbia University faculty
New England College faculty
St. Mary's College of Maryland faculty
Art Center College of Design faculty
Johns Hopkins University alumni
Nonverbal communication

External links

Poem-eo (Video art poem) by Judith Hall "NATURAL WORKS / HARD / ABILITY" produced by LSU Press, music by Alec Bernstein